Highland Township, Nebraska may refer to the following places in Nebraska:

 Highland Township, Adams County, Nebraska
 Highland Township, Gage County, Nebraska

See also
Highland Township (disambiguation)

Nebraska township disambiguation pages